The 2016 Puerto Rico Soccer League season is the 8th season as Puerto Rico's top-division football league.

Teams

Standings

Apertura

Clausura

Playoffs

Player statistics

Apertura Season Top Scorers

Clausura Season Top Scorers

References

External links 
 

Puerto Rico Soccer League seasons
2016 in association football
2016 in Puerto Rican football